The National Law School Debate (NLS Debate) is an annual debating tournament conducted by the Literary and Debating Society of the National Law School of India University, Bangalore, for teams from universities all over Asia. The debates is held in the 3-on-3 format.

History 
NLS-D began with an intent to popularize debating across the country has advanced in its quality, and has improved in terms of the reach of the tournament. NLS-D remains the only South Asian face of any International debate competition. The debate had very humble beginnings. The 1st edition which happened in November 2002, saw nine teams taking part. It followed the 2-on-2 debating format. St. Stephen's College was the winner, while National University of Juridical Sciences(NUJS) were the runners-up. The 4th edition of the Debate saw it being transmuted into a 3-on-3 parliamentary Debating format. The number of participating teams increased from 9 to 80, in a span of 9 years.
The debate has seen the participation of many Indian Institutions like Indian Institute of Technology, Bombay (IIT-B), MNLU Mumbai, R.V. College of Engineering, St. Stephen's College,Delhi Technological University, Ramjas College, Loyola College, Hansraj, etc. and International teams like Faculty of Law-Colombo (FOLC), Lahore University of Management Studies (LUMS), The American University of Bangladesh etc.

The Tournament has been won the most number of times by RVCE, Bangalore  with a tally of 3 wins.IIT Bombay, IIT Delhi, NLU Delhi, Ramjas College and FOLC have won it 2 times each.

The five-member Indian team included Tejas Subramaniam (PSBB School), Bhavya Shah (a visually impaired student from the Rao Junior College of Science, Mumbai), Manya Gupta (Neerja Modi School, Jaipur), Saranya Ravindran (also from PSBB School, Chennai) and Prithvi Arun (Sri Sankara Senior Secondary School, Chennai). Tejas Subramaniam of the Padma Seshadri Bal Bhavan (PSBB) School, Chennai, adjudged the best speaker. IIT Delhi won the title for 3 consecutive years in a row, (Agastya Sajjan). The three year win streak was broken by Chirag Jadhav (IIT Bombay) in the year 2018. The Debate has not been organized due to COVID-19.

The Debate has managed to stay on the fun side of the spectrum with its legendary break night party, which is the social event of the debate calendar in addition to an opening night dinner and a closing Championship Party. The level of hospitality that the college has extended, which involves every team getting picked up and getting dropped from the airport/Railway Station, Accommodation and Food for the entire duration of the tournament. A separate novice break for people who haven't debated before encourages greater participation.

The 2020 edition was cancelled due to COVID-19. Due to the pandemic, the 2021 edition was shifted to the online medium.

List of Winners

Format of the event. 

The debate follows a 3-on-3 format, with one team (of 3 speakers each) forming the Government, and the other the Opposition. The process of scoring and tabbing them is called tabbing. The scoring of the teams is done by judges who are students from the participating colleges, who return the scores to the adjudication team, led by the Chief Adjudicator (CA), and is assisted by the Deputy Chief Adjudicator (DCA), and the Deputy Chief Adjudicator(Observer).

References 

Asian debating competitions